'Musa al-Qarni (1954 – 12 October 2021) was a Saudi Arabian mufti, who once advised Osama bin Laden.

Views
Al-Qarni: ["The uproar and the chaos that we see today in the human race – the killing, the acts of aggression, the rape, the robbery, and the disgrace of honor – what causes this is that the banners which are hoisted high are those of the Jews, the Christians, and other religions and faiths, and not the banner of 'There is no God but Allah and Muhammad is Allah's Messenger.'

"Let's have a look at what is written in the Koran. What position must we adopt towards Allah's enemies? Is it the position we have adopted? First of all, we must be aware of the fact that at present we see that [the West] doesn't want us even to say the words 'Allah's enemies.' They don't want us to say that the Jews and the Christians are Allah's enemies. They don't want us to say that the Jews and the Christians are the enemies of the Muslims and the enemies of Islam."

He has also advocated that offensive jihad against unbelievers be resumed when Muslims are strong enough to do so."What role do the verses of jihad and of fighting play in our lives? Do we only deal with part of the Koran in our lives, disregarding the rest, or are we enjoined to act according to the Koran in its entirety? Therefore, I now have the right to ask - and I’m directing this question first of all to myself and to anybody interested in Muslim affairs - what role do these verses play in our lives today? Where are the Al-Anfal verses? Where are the Baraa verses? The Battle of Badr was recounted in the Al-Anfal sura. What is their connection to our lives today? Do we recite these verses only in order to remind ourselves what happened to the Prophet and his companions, and then sever them from our lives and separate them from our lives completely?

"Are we really educating in all our curricula, our sermons, our lectures, in all our meetings, on the satellite channels and in our media- are we really educating ourselves as the Prophet’s companions were educated? Are we educating ourselves to be a nation of jihad, are we educating ourselves to be a fighting nation, are we educating ourselves to be a nation of the sword and the Koran? Are we educating ourselves to be a nation that conquers the entire world or are we educating ourselves to different things?"

Detention and death 
Al-Qarni was arrested in 2007 and sentenced to 15 years in prison. In 2018, he suffered brain damage from a stroke and was transferred from prison to a psychiatric hospital. He died in October 2021 at the age of 67.

References and notes

External links
Musa Al-Qarni on Jihad
Saudi Cleric Musa Al-Qarni: Spreading Islam by the Sword Is, at Times, Justified
Yemen's Al-Iman University: A Pipeline for Fundamentalists?

1954 births
2021 deaths
Saudi Arabian Islamists
20th-century Muslim scholars of Islam
Osama bin Laden
Saudi Arabian Sunni Muslims
Prisoners and detainees of Saudi Arabia